Richard Railton (by 1522 – will proved 1575), of Canterbury, Kent, was an English politician.

Career
He was a Member of Parliament (MP) for Canterbury.

References

1575 deaths
English MPs 1554–1555
People from Canterbury
Year of birth uncertain